Jokić is a Serbian surname, a patronymic derived from Joko, itself a diminutive of masculine given name Jokan. It may refer to:

Bojan Jokić (born 1986), Slovenian footballer
Đorđe Jokić (born 1981), Serbian footballer
Ljubiša Jokić (born 1958), Serbian former general
Mihailo Jokić (born 1948), Serbian educator and politician
Milan Jokić (born 1995), Serbian football midfielder 
Miloš Jokić (born 1987), Serbian footballer
Miodrag Jokić (born 1935), the last commander of the Yugoslav Navy
Nikola Jokić (born 1995), Serbian basketball player
Petar Jokić (disambiguation), several people
Predrag Jokić,  Montenegrin water polo player
Dallas Jokic, American voice actor

See also
Joković
Jokanović
Jukić
Đokić

Serbian surnames